Vyborg is a town in Leningrad Oblast, Russia.

Vyborg may also refer to:
Vyborg (airline), a former airline based in St. Petersburg, Russia
Vyborg railway station, a railway station in Vyborg, Leningrad Oblast, Russia
Finnish coastal defence ship Väinämöinen or Vyborg
US West Cajoot or Vyborg, a Soviet cargo ship in 1942–1947
Vyborg, a Soviet ship sunk by the Finnish submarine Vesikko in 1941

See also
Siege of Vyborg (disambiguation)

Viborg (disambiguation)
Vyborgsky (disambiguation)
Sveaborg, a sea fortress near Helsinki, Finland